Baptiste Gabard (born 28 January 2000) is a French professional footballer who plays as a midfielder for Championnat National 3 club Saint-Étienne B.

Early life 
Gabard first started playing football in Veauche, Loire, before joining Saint-Étienne in 2009.

Club career 
Having been a regular in Saint-Étienne's reserve team in the Championnat National 3, Gabard signed his first professional contract in December 2020. He made his professional debut for Saint-Étienne under Claude Puel on 17 January 2021, in a Ligue 1 game against Strasbourg.

References

External links
 

2000 births
Living people
French footballers
Association football midfielders
Footballers from Saint-Étienne
AS Saint-Étienne players
Ligue 1 players
Championnat National 2 players
Championnat National 3 players